Retail geography, or geography of retailing, is the study of where to place retail stores based on where their customers are. The use of retail geography has grown significantly in the past decade as a result of the use of geographic information systems (GIS). It first emerged in the United States in the 1960s. In the 1990s, the "new retail geography" emerged.

Related Research Books
John Alan Dawson, 1980, Retail Geography, London: Croom Helm.
Mark Birkin; Graham Clarke; Martin P. Clarke (14 June 2002). Retail Geography and Intelligent Network Planning. John Wiley & Sons.

See also
Marketing geography
Geo (marketing)
Economic geography
Business geography

References

Economic geography